Basra Specialized Spherical School (BSSS) was opened on the recommendation of Bassam Raouf, Director of the Department of Football Specialized Schools at the Federal Ministry of Youth and Sports in 2012.

Location and Management
The Spherical School is located in the area Kut al-Hijjaj in the center of Basra, and headed by coach Hassan Mawla since its inception. The Spherical School team won the title of the Perfect Team by the Ministry of Youth and Sports at the 2018 tournament.

References

External links
Official website

Sport in Basra
Football in Iraq
Football academies in Asia